Cuban anole may refer to:

Anolis equestris, or Cuban knight anole, a species of anole
Anolis sagrei, or Cuban brown anole, another species of anole

Animal common name disambiguation pages